Jenni Räsänen (born 5 December 1990) is a Finnish curler. She currently plays lead for Oona Kauste.

After marriage in 2018 she changed surname, now she is Jenni Honkavaara.

References

External links
 
 Jenni Räsänen on the Finnish Curling Association database
 

Living people
Finnish female curlers
1990 births
Finnish curling champions